is a Japanese football player currently playing for Shonan Bellmare.

Club statistics
Updated to 5 November 2022.

1Includes Suruga Bank Championship, J. League Championship and FIFA Club World Cup.

National team statistics

Honors

Júbilo Iwata
 J.League Cup (1): 2010
 Suruga Bank Championship (1): 2011

Kashima Antlers
 J1 League (1): 2016
 Emperor's Cup (1): 2016
 J.League Cup (1): 2015
 Japanese Super Cup (1): 2017
 AFC Champions League (1): 2018

References

External links

 Profile at Kashima Antlers

1985 births
Living people
Waseda University alumni
Association football people from Iwate Prefecture
Japanese footballers
J1 League players
Júbilo Iwata players
Kashima Antlers players
Shonan Bellmare players
Footballers at the 2006 Asian Games
Association football defenders
Japan international footballers
Asian Games competitors for Japan